Karl Beck (8 May 1888 – 16 February 1972) was an Austrian footballer. He played in nine matches for the Austria national football team from 1907 to 1918.

References

External links 
 

1888 births
1972 deaths
Austrian footballers
Austria international footballers
People from Břeclav District
Association football forwards
Wiener Sport-Club players
Austrian football managers